Cedar Creek is an unincorporated community in Scott County, in the U.S. state of Arkansas.

History
Cedar Creek was founded in 1852 and named after a stream of the same name near the town site. Variant names are "Big Cedar", "Cedar", and "Cedarcreek".  The Cedar Creek post office was discontinued in 1973.

References

Unincorporated communities in Arkansas
Unincorporated communities in Scott County, Arkansas